Stanislaus Nuclear Power Plant was proposed by Pacific Gas & Electric in 1971 as two GE 1,200 MW units, but the project was canceled in 1979.

A total of 63 nuclear units were canceled in the USA between 1975 and 1980.

See also

Bodega Bay Nuclear Power Plant
List of books about nuclear issues
Nuclear power debate
Nuclear power in the United States
List of canceled nuclear plants in the United States

References

External links
 Cancelled Nuclear Units Ordered in the United States 

Cancelled nuclear power stations in the United States
Nuclear power plants in California
Pacific Gas and Electric Company